The ji (pronunciation: , English approximation:) was a Chinese polearm, sometimes translated into English as spear or halberd, though they are fundamentally different weapons. They were used in one form or another for over 3000 years, from at least as early as the Zhou dynasty, until the end of the Qing dynasty. They are still used for training purposes in many Chinese martial arts.

History

The ji was initially a hybrid between a spear and a dagger-axe. It was a relatively common infantry weapon in Ancient China, and was also used by cavalry and charioteers.

In the Song dynasty, several weapons were referred to as ji, but they were developed from spears, not from ancient ji.  One variety was called the qinglong ji, and had a spear tip with a crescent blade on one side. Another type was the fangtian ji, which had a spear tip with crescent blades on both sides. They had multiple means of attack: the side blade or blades, the spear tip, plus often a rear counterweight that could be used to strike the opponent. The way the side blades were fixed to the shaft differs, but usually there were empty spaces between the pole and the side blade. The wielder could strike with the shaft, with the option of then pulling the weapon back to hook with a side blade; or, he could slap his opponent with the flat side of the blade to knock him off his horse.

Popular legend
One of the earliest known appearances of the Ji in the historical record is the fangtian huaji attributed to the warrior Lü Bu in the Romance of the Three Kingdoms. It is unknown whether the peculiarity of his weapon was a literary device used by Luo Guanzhong, the author. Since this novel was based on earlier depictions of the era during the Song dynasty, the Song-era polearm may have been named based on its similarity to, or in honor of, the weapon that was attributed to Lü Bu in this famous novel. This would be comparable to the famous semi-mythological origin story of the yanyuedao (lit. "reclining moon blade"), the weapon wielded by Guan Yu, another character from the novel and a real historical person. The first historical or archaeological evidence of this polearm comes from an 11th-century illustration in the military manual Wujing Zongyao. The yanyuedao came to be known as the guandao after its invention was anachronistically attributed to Guan Yu himself, due to his wielding the weapon throughout the Romance.

Gallery

See also
 Kama-yari
 Lucerne hammer
 Poleaxe
 Halberd

References

Bibliography
 

Blade weapons
Chinese melee weapons
Polearms
Spears